List of presidents of the National Council of Slovenia.

Below is a list of office-holders:

References

See also
National Council (Slovenia)

Slovenia, National Council
Presidents